Events from the year 1986 in Kuwait.

Incumbents
Emir: Jaber Al-Ahmad Al-Jaber Al-Sabah
Prime Minister: Saad Al-Salim Al-Sabah

Events

Births

 5 October - Hamad Al Enezi.
 11 December - Ali Maqseed.

References

 
Kuwait
Kuwait
Years of the 20th century in Kuwait
1980s in Kuwait